African pepper is a name for several unrelated pepper-like spices traded from the general region of West Africa:

 Aframomum melegueta from the ginger family (Zingiberaceae), also known as grains of paradise, melegueta pepper, alligator pepper, Guinea grains, ossame, fom wisa, and (ambiguously) Guinea pepper
 Piper guineense from the pepper family (Piperaceae), also known as West African pepper, Ashanti pepper, Benin pepper, false cubeb, Guinea cubeb, kale, kukauabe, masoro, sasema, soro wisa, and uziza
 Xylopia aethiopica from the custard apple family (Annonaceae), primary source of the spice most commonly known in the West as grains of Selim
 Xylopia striata, a closely related source of grains of Selim, with larger seed pods
 Grains of Selim, also known as Kani pepper, Senegal pepper, Ethiopian pepper, Moor pepper, Negro pepper, kimba, kili, and (ambiguously) Guinea pepper